Sava Gerchev (born 22 January 1914, date of death unknown) was a Bulgarian cyclist. He competed in the team pursuit event at the 1936 Summer Olympics.

References

External links
 

1914 births
Year of death missing
Bulgarian male cyclists
Olympic cyclists of Bulgaria
Cyclists at the 1936 Summer Olympics
Place of birth missing